Rajeev Kumar Varshney (born 13 July 1973) is an agricultural scientist, specializing in genomics, genetics, molecular breeding and capacity building in developing countries. Varsheny is currently the Research Program Director- Genetic Gains that includes several units viz. Genomics & Trait Discovery, Forward Breeding, Pre-Breeding, Cell, Molecular Biology & Genetic Engineering, Seed Systems, Biotechnology- ESA, Sequencing and Informatics Services Unit, and Genebank (until 2020); and Director, Center of Excellence in Genomics & Systems Biology at the International Crops Research Institute for the Semi-Arid Tropics (ICRISAT), a global agricultural research institute. He holds Adjunct/Honorary/Visiting Professor positions at 10 academic institutions in Australia, China, Ghana, Hong Kong and India, including Murdoch University, The University of Western Australia, University of Queensland, West Africa Centre for Crop Improvement (University of Ghana), University of Hyderabad, Chaudhary Charan Singh University and Professor Jayashankar Telangana State Agricultural University.

Varshney, a highly cited researcher for 7 consecutive years (2014-2020), is a highly prolific author and frequently invited speaker including TEDx speaker. Varshney has presented research and novel concepts related to food and nutrition security in several high-level fora such as: G8 International Conference on Open Data for Agriculture on Open Data in Genomics and Modern Breeding for Crop Improvement, organized by US and UK Governments in the World Bank (2013); Brainstorming session on Digital Revolution for Agriculture at Bill & Melinda Gates Foundation in (2012); Brainstorming session on DNA Fingerprinting for Impact Assessment, BMGF, USA (2018); FAO's international conference on Agricultural Biotechnology in Developing Countries in Mexico (2010); FAO's Regional Conference on Agricultural Bio technologies in Sustainable Foods Systems and Nutrition in Asia-Pacific Kuala Lumpur, Malaysia (2017) etc. Varshney’s research and interviews have been published in many Indian/ International print and electronic media including TV channels and radio programs. He has been honored with elected and honorary fellowships from a dozen academies/ societies and  awards from USA, Germany, China, India, Nepal, Vietnam, Philippines, UAE, including Shanti Swarup Bhatnagar Prize and Rafi Ahmed Kidwai Award, the science and agricultural sciences awards from Government of India in 2015 and 2019, respectively.

Education and Professional career
Varshney received his bachelor's degree (B.Sc. Honours) in Botany and master's degree in Botany (Genetics, Plant Breeding and Molecular Biology) from the Aligarh Muslim University, Aligarh in 1993 and 1995, respectively. He then joined the laboratory of Professor P K Gupta at Chaudhary Charan Singh University, Meerut and earned doctoral degree (PhD) in 2001 in Agriculture (Molecular Biology) based on work done on a Wheat Biotechnology Project sponsored by Department of Biotechnology, Government of India. In addition, Varshney has undertaken several high-performance leadership and management courses from the leading business and management schools in Singapore, Malaysia and The Philippines.
 
After receiving his PhD degree, Varshney took up an assignment of Wissenschaftlicher Mitarbeiter (Research Scientist) in 2001 at Leibniz Institute of Plant Genetics & Crop Plant Research (IPK), Gatersleben, Germany. He worked there for five years in the area of structural and functional genomics of barley and comparative genomics of cereals. He then accepted the assignment of Senior Scientist for Applied Genomics at ICRISAT in late 2005. While working at ICRISAT, he took up a half time appointment with Generation Challenge Programme, hosted at CGIAR CIMMYT, as SubProgramme Leader for SubProgramme 2- Genomics towards Gene Discovery in 2007. With an objective to accelerate genomics research in dryland crops, he as a Founding Director established Center of Excellence in Genomics in 2007, with support from Department of Biotechnology Government of India. Later in 2017, this center transformed into Center of Excellence in Genomics & Systems Biology. He was promoted to the position of Principal Scientist (Applied Genomics) at ICRISAT in 2008. He had a dual appointment with ICRISAT as Principal Scientist and GCP as SubProgramme Leader from 2007- 2013. He served as Research Program Director–
Grain Legumes for a period of three years (2013-2016) and since 2016 is serving as Global Research Program Director– Genetic Gains, after restructuring of the Research Programs at ICRISAT in 2015.

Fellowships
 Elected Fellow of Indian Academy of Sciences, Bangalore in 2019
 Elected Fellow of American Society of Agronomy (ASA) in 2018
 Elected Fellow of American Association for the Advancement of Sciences (AAAS) in 2016
 Elected Fellow of The World Academy of Sciences (TWAS) in 2016
 Elected Fellow of German National Academy of Sciences Leopoldina in 2016
 Elected Fellow of Crop Science Society of America (CSSA) in 2015.
 Elected Fellow of Indian National Science Academy (INSA) in 2013.
 Elected Fellow of The National Academy of Sciences, India (NASI) in 2015.
 Elected Fellow of National Academy of Agricultural Sciences, India (NAAS) in 2010.
 Elected Fellow of AP Akademi of Sciences (APAS) and Telangana Academy of Sciences (TAS), India in 2014.
 Elected Fellow of Indian Society of Genetics and Plant Breeding in 2015.
 Elected Fellow of Association of Biotechnology & Pharmacy (ABAP), India in 2015

Notable awards
Based on his research contribution, he has received several awards/ fellowships such as:
 Scientific and Technological Co-operation Award by Government of Guangdong Province China, 2020
 Rafi Ahmed Kidwai Award for Outstanding Research in Agricultural Science 2019
 Honorary Fellow of Indian Society of Pulses Research & Development 2019
 Professor Jayashankar (PJTSAU) Life Time Achievement Award 2019
 G. D. Birla Award for Scientific Research for 2018
Prof. Lalji Singh Achievement Award by ADNAT/ CSIR- CCMB, 2019
 JC Bose Fellowship from Science and Engineering Research Board, 2018
 Honorary Professorship of Zhejiang Academy of Agricultural Sciences (ZAAS) in 2018
 Certificate and Honor for Outstanding Science Contribution by Uttar Pradesh Government, 2018 
 One of the “40 Most Influential Foreign Experts” by The Association for International Exchange of Talents in Shandong, China, 2018 
 Faculty research Awards 2018: Outstanding Authors 2018 for 2018.
 Doreen Margaret Mashler Award by ICRISAT for 2016.
 IPGI Award for leadership & contribution to peanut research by the International Peanut Genome Initiative for 2017.
 Qilu Friendship Award by the People’s Republic of China for 2016. 
 Shanti Swarup Bhatnagar Prize - Biological Sciences, the most coveted award from Council of Scientific & Industrial Research (CSIR) on behalf of the Government of India in 2015. 
 Research Excellence India Citation Award 2015 by Thomson Reuters
 The Illumina Agricultural Greater Good Initiative Award, 2013
 Young Crop Scientist Award by Crop Science Society of America (CSSA), 2013
 Young Scientist Award in Agriculture in 2010 by National Academy of Sciences, India and Elsevier South Asia
 INSA-Young Scientist Medal by the Indian National Science Academy (INSA), 2008
 NASI-Young Scientist Platinum Jubilee Award by the National Academy of Sciences, India (NASI), 2007

Significant contribution to crop genetics and breeding
Varshney has made significant scientific contributions including the following:

Reference genome sequence assemblies for 13 plant species: namely pigeonpea, chickpea, diploid progenitors and cultivated groundnut, pearl millet, sesame, mungbean, adzuki bean, longan, Jatropha, Soybean and Celery
Integration of genomic innovations in breeding for development of improved varieties: Drought tolerance and Fusarium Wilt resistance in Chickpea in India and Ethiopia, High Oleic groundnut variety
Genomic resources for genetics and plant breeding: catalogues of genome variations, gene expression atlases, high density and low density genotyping platforms, >50 genetic maps, QTLs/molecular markers for >20 traits in legumes crops
Novel concepts and approaches: Genomics-assisted breeding, Genic micro-satellites, Translational Genomics for crop improvement, Super-Pangenome, 5Gs for crop genetic improvement and haplotype-based breeding 
Decision support tools and pipelines for genomics research and breeding applications: ISMU, CicArVarDB, CicArMiSatDB
Improved seed delivery system: Contributed to seed system by providing strategic guidance and support to replace old varieties in farmers’ fields and strengthening seed system in developing countries in Africa and Asia

Service to the scientific community
Varshney has served/ serving Editorial Board of several journals like Plant Biotechnology Journal, Theoretical and Applied Genetics, Molecular Genetics & Genomics, Plant Breeding, The Plant Genome, Frontiers in Plant Science, Crop and Pasture Science, BMC Plant Biology, BMC Genetics, Molecular Breeding, Euphytica, Plant Genetic Resources, Journal of Plant Biochemistry and Biotechnology, etc. He has been a Guest Editor for Special Issue for several journals like Current Opinion in Plant Biology, Molecular Breeding, Plant Breeding, Briefing in Functional Genomics, Frontiers in Plant Science, Plant Genetic Resources, etc.

Varshney has served/serving Steering Committee/ Organizing Committee/ Programme Committee for several international conferences including FAO Conference on Application of Biotechnologies in Developing Countries (ABDC-10), Plant & Animal Genome Conference Asia. As a Chair, Varshney organized several conferences including ICLGG, five editions of NGGIBCI and InterDrought-V

Varshney has delivered invited presentations in several high-level meetings related to international agricultural research including: (i) G8 International Conference on Open Data for Agriculture on Open Data in Genomics and Modern Breeding for Crop Improvement, organized by US and UK Governments in the World Bank 29–30 April 2013], (ii) brainstorming session on Digital Revolution for Agriculture at Bill & Melinda Gates Foundation in July 2012, (iii) brainstorming session on DNA Fingerprinting for Impact Assessment, BMGF, USA (2018), (iv) FAO's international conference on Agricultural Biotechnology in Developing Countries in Mexico (2010), (v) FAO's Regional Conference on Agricultural Bio technologies in Sustainable Foods Systems and Nutrition in Asia-Pacific Kuala Lumpur, Malaysia (2017), (vi) Scientific Advisory Committee Meeting on Article 17 (Global Information System) of International Treaty on Plant Genetic Resources for Food & Agriculture of United Nations' FAO (2016), (vii) Quality of Research Workshop organized by CGIAR (2017), (viii) Science Forum of CGIAR in Wageningen, The Netherlands (2009). While serving international agriculture in developing countries, Varshney had privilege to meet several high profile and influential personalities from science, society and politics that includes Noble Laureate (Late) Dr Norman Borlaug, Mr Bill Gates, Co-Chair of Bill & Melinda Gates Foundation and Mr Narendra Modi, the Prime Minister of India.

Research projects and grants
Varshney's research has been funded by research grants from several international funding agencies like Bill & Melinda Gates Foundation, United States Agency for International Development, Generation Challenge Programme, US National Science Foundation,  Indo-German Science and Technology Centre and leading Indian funding organizations like Indian Council of Agricultural Research, Department of Biotechnology, and Department of Science and Technology (India).

Research publications
Rajeev a prolific author and world renowned researcher have published more than 450 research papers/articles in high impact research journals. Some of these journals include Nature, Nature Biotechnology, Nature Genetics, PNAS-USA, Genome Biology, Trends in Plant Science, Current Opinion in Plant Biology, Trends in Biotechnology, The Plant Journal, DNA Research, Plant Biotechnology Journal, Molecular Plant, Functional & Integrative Genomics, Theoretical and Applied Genetics, Plant Breeding, etc. He is the youngest (47) agricultural/plant scientist and 4th Indian who have achieved an h-index of 100 as per Google Scholar. For more info visit his Google Scholar profile.

List of Books
Varshney has edited/ co-edited several books that makes significant contribution to agricultural science, plant genomics, molecular breeding etc. field and serves as good resource for Early Career Researchers. Select list of Varshney’s books are available at Amazon

References

Indian geneticists
1973 births
Living people
Fellows of the National Academy of Agricultural Sciences
People from Moradabad district
Scientists from Uttar Pradesh
Indian scientific authors
Aligarh Muslim University alumni
Chaudhary Charan Singh University alumni
Fellows of the Indian National Science Academy
Academic staff of the University of Western Australia
Recipients of the Shanti Swarup Bhatnagar Award in Biological Science
Fellows of the African Academy of Sciences
Associate Fellows of the African Academy of Sciences